Beverly Hills Chihuahua 2 is a 2011 American comedy film. It is the sequel to 2008's Beverly Hills Chihuahua and the second film in the Beverly Hills Chihuahua series. Directed by Alex Zamm, and starring George Lopez, Odette Yustman and Zachary Gordon, the film focuses on Papi and Chloe, now married with five puppies. The film was released by Walt Disney Studios Home Entertainment on February 1, 2011, in a two-disc Blu-ray and DVD combo pack.

Another sequel, Beverly Hills Chihuahua 3: Viva la Fiesta!, was released on September 18, 2012.

Plot
Two years after the events of the first film, newly married couple Papi (voiced by George Lopez) and Chloe (voiced by Odette Yustman) are trying to keep up with their five puppies Papi Jr, Lala, Rosa, Ali and Pep (voiced by Zachary Gordon, Madison Pettis, Chantilly Spalan, Delaney Jones and Emily Osment) running around the house, creating problem after problem. However, Papi shows a soft side for the pups and occasionally tells them of their ancient ancestors, the Chihuahua Warriors. Aunt Viv (Susan Blakely), Chloe's owner, is in the rain forest for the next 6 months with her niece, Rachel (Erin Cahill) searching for plants for medical research. During this time Sam (Marcus Coloma), Papi's owner and Rachel's boyfriend, is caring for the whole chihuahua family. Sam takes Chloe, Papi and the puppies back home to meet his parents, Mr. and Mrs. Cortez (Castulo Guerra and Lupe Ontiveros).

Sam finds out that his parents are struggling to pay the mortgage on their house and the bank plans to take their home and sell it. Chloe and the rest of the dogs decide to compete in a dog show in order to win a large cash prize. Delgado, an old friend, also comes to the home and tells Chloe that he needs her help with a secret mission. The mission turns out to be Delgado trying to tell his two sons the truth about why he left them as puppies, but he cannot bring himself to do it. Later, Papi initially wins the dog show, but is later disqualified due to lack of breed papers, losing to an arrogant and vain French poodle named Appoline (Bridgit Mendler). After hearing that Delgado has sons in Los Angeles, the puppies set off to find them. In trying to help, the puppies get caught up in a bank robbery.

Meanwhile, Chloe, Papi, Pedro (Papi's adoptive brother) and Delgado are trying to find the puppies when they appear running across the television screen at the site of the bank robbery. They run to the bank to begin searching for the puppies. The puppies happen to crawl into the crooks' duffel bags and end up at Hoffman's Bread Factory. Pedro finds a mask with the scent of bread on it which leads them to the factory. They foil the robbery, then return home to find that they have been awarded more than enough money to save their house and Rachel and Aunt Viv have returned. Delgado also goes back into the police force with his two sons, now that they found out the truth on why Delgado left them as pups. Rachel accepts Sam's marriage proposal and the family celebrates.

Cast
 Phill Lewis as Mr. McKibble
 Marcus Coloma as Sam Cortez
 Erin Cahill as Rachel Ashe
 Susan Blakely as Vivian 'Viv' Ashe (Blakely replaces Jamie Lee Curtis as the actor of Vivian 'Viv' ashe) 
 Lupe Ontiveros as Mrs. Cortez (Ontiveros' last film role)
 Castulo Guerra as Mr. Cortez
 Elaine Hendrix as Colleen Mansfield (Appoline's owner)
 Brian Stepanek as the Banker
 Morgan Fairchild as Beverly Hills Dog Show Commentator/Dog Show Judge #1
 French Stewart as Beverly Hills Dog Show Commentator/Dog Show Judge #2

Voices
 George Lopez as Papi
 Odette Yustman as Chloe, Papi's wife. Yustman replaced Drew Barrymore as the voice of Chloe.
 Miguel Ferrer as Delgado. Ferrer replaced Andy García as the voice of Delgado.
 Ernie Hudson as Pedro
 Zachary Gordon as Papi Jr.
 Chantilly Spalan as Rosa
 Emily Osment as Pep
 Madison Pettis as Lala
 Delaney Jones as Ali
 Tom Kenny as Sebastian
 Loretta Devine as Delta
 Bridgit Mendler as Marie Appoline Bouvier
 Alyssa Milano as Biminy

Music

This Is My Paradise

"This is My Paradise" is a song performed by American pop recording artist Bridgit Mendler. The song was created by Mendler and produced by Chen Neeman. It was released as a promotional single on January 11, 2011.

Critical reception
Sweets Lyrics commented that the song is about summer and the beach, despite it being winter in the United States when it was released. Disney Dreaming said the song was light and fun.

Track listing
U.S. digital download
"This Is My Paradise" – 3:19

Music video
The video of the song was recorded in Beverly Hills, California in November 2010 and directed by Alex Zamm. The video was released on December 19 by Disney Channel, and on YouTube one day later. The video begins with Mendler traveling in an old red and white kombi, leaving Beverly Hills and going to Baja California, Mexico. She sings and writes on the road. After finding her friends, Mendler walks on the beach and plays guitar. They camp by the sun.

Chart performance

References

External links
 
 
 
 
 

2011 direct-to-video films
2011 films
2010s English-language films
2010s children's comedy films
American children's comedy films
Direct-to-video sequel films
Disney direct-to-video films
Films about animals
Films about dogs
Films about pets
Films directed by Alex Zamm
Films set in Beverly Hills, California
2011 comedy films
Beverly Hills Chihuahua (film series)
Films produced by David Hoberman
2010s American films